The Olympic Sports Centre, from 2016 until 2020: Elektrum Olympic Centre, Elektrum Olimpiskais centrs, from 2021 until now Rimi Olympic Centre, Rimi Olimpiskais centrs) is an indoor multi-functional sports facility in Rīga, Latvia, which was opened in 2005 at the former location of the Riga hippodrome by the Latvian Olympic Committee as part of a nationwide network of Olympic centres designed to improve the training and competition facilities of Latvian athletes.

Facilities
The Olympic Sports Centre covers the area of approximately 24,000 square meters and can be used by more than 4,000 visitors per day. The centre offers a multifunctional sports hall, an artificial turf football hall, facilities for basketball, volleyball, beach volleyball, athletics, swimming, gymnastics and aerobic training, as well as office spaces and a café. The headquarters of the Latvian Olympic Committee and Latvian Football Federation are located at the centre. In 2009, the centre was awarded the “European Healthy Stadia” status.

Events
The arena has hosted a variety of sporting competitions, as well as concerts, seminars and exhibitions, such as the 2006 NATO Riga Summit. It was the second arena of the 2016 Men's World Floorball Championships, the first being Arēna Rīga. It was the second arena of the 2021 Men's ice hockey World Championships, which is hosted only by Latvia. EuroBasket Women 2021 was held in Basketball hall.

See also 
 List of indoor arenas in Latvia

References
Olympic Sports Centre Riga. Olimpiskais Sporta Centrs. Retrieved on 2011-12-27.
"Olimpiskais sporta centrs" turpmāk nesīs "Elektrum" vārdu. (Latvian)    Latvijas Olimpiskā komiteja. March 17, 2016. Retrieved on December 16, 2016.
Olimpiskais sporta centrs maina nosaukumu (Latvian)  12.08.2021.

External links

 

Sports venues in Latvia
Sports venues completed in 2005
Sport in Riga
Entertainment venues in Riga
Basketball venues in Latvia
Football venues in Latvia
Buildings and structures in Riga